The term Macedonian Church may refer to:

- in general, any Church in the historical region of Macedonia, including:
 Church in ancient (Roman and Byzantine) province of Macedonia (see: Metropolitanate of Macedonia, centered in Thessaloniki)

- within Eastern Orthodoxy:
 Macedonian Orthodox Church – Ohrid Archbishopric, an Eastern Orthodox denomination, centered in North Macedonia
 Macedonian Genuine Orthodox Church (sr), an Eastern Orthodox denomination, founded in 2010

- within Catholicism:
 Catholic Church in North Macedonia, the Catholic Church in modern North Macedonia
 Macedonian Byzantine Catholic Church, an Eastern Catholic denomination

See also 
 Church (disambiguation)
 Macedonian (disambiguation)
 Macedonian Orthodox Church (disambiguation)